Iurie Muntean (born 13 May 1972) is a Moldovan politician, who served as a deputy Minister of Economy and Trade (2008–2009) and member of the Parliament of Moldova (2009–2014).

Biography
He graduated from Moldova State University in 1994. Iurie Muntean worked as a jurist for the Ministry of Economy (July 1994–June 1996), ARIA (1996–2002, August 2006–April 2007), the office of lawyers „Justil Group”. Then he served as a deputy of Igor Dodon. In March 2001, Iurie Muntean participated with journalists Constantin Tănase, Aneta Grosu, and the folk music singer Maria Sarabaş in a Romanian-Moldovan delegation to Atlanta, where Iurie Muntean danced "Hora Unirii", which is contrary to his communist ideology. Muntean, however, denies having danced Hora Unirii.

Iurie Muntean served as the executive secretary of the Party of Communists (PCRM) since 2010. Iurie Muntean was at one point a favourite to succeed Vladimir Voronin as the head of the Party of Communists (PCRM).

In the summer of 2014, Iurie Muntean was excluded from the PCRM Executive Committee, then from the position of party executive secretary, that on 23 December 2014 he would be definitively excluded from the Communist Party. About his exclusion from the party Muntean later said: “I was excluded from PCRM for leftist views”... "although I am a true third-generation communist."

Known for his strong Moldovenist position, Iurie Muntean appeared in public at some rallies in a T-shirt that had inscribed on him „Еу сынт молдован! Еу грэеск молдовенеште!’ (written in Cyrillic: “I am Moldovan, I speak Moldavian”). His brother Ivan Muntean is the leader of the obstastie association "I am Moldovan, I speak Moldovan".

In 2019, together with Mark Tkaciuk, he founded the Collective Action Party – Civic Congress.

References

External links 
 Jurnal de Chişinău, File secrete din biografia lui Iurie Muntean(u)
 Timpul de dimineață, De ce lui Voronin i-s dragi foştii unionişti
 Timpul de dimineață, De ce vrea Voronin să-i lase partidul "românului" Iurie Muntean?
 2001 Annual Report

1972 births
Living people
People from Criuleni District
Moldovan communists
Members of the parliament of Moldova
Moldovan jurists
Communist Party of Moldavia politicians
Moldovan MPs 2009
Moldovan MPs 2009–2010
Party of Communists of the Republic of Moldova politicians